The 1975–76 European Cup was the 11th edition of the European Cup, IIHF's premier European club ice hockey tournament. The season started on November 13, 1975, and finished on December 9, 1977.

The tournament was won by CSKA Moscow, who beat Poldi Kladno in the final

First round

 Tappara,  
 Brynäs IF  :  bye

Second round

Third round

 Poldi Kladno,  
 CSKA Moscow  :  bye

Semifinals

Finals

References 
 Season 1976

1
IIHF European Cup